Kurennoye is a rural locality (a khutor) in Semeyskoye Rural Settlement, Podgorensky District, Voronezh Oblast, Russia. The population was 138 as of 2010. There are 5 streets.

Geography 
Kurennoye is located 28 km southeast of Podgorensky (the district's administrative centre) by road. Saprino is the nearest rural locality.

References 

Rural localities in Podgorensky District